Travis Denney (born 19 February 1976) is a male badminton player from Australia.

Denney competed in badminton at the 2004 Summer Olympics in men's doubles with partner Ashley Brehaut.  They were defeated in the round of 32 by Pramote Teerawiwatana and Tesana Panvisvas of Thailand.  In mixed doubles, Denney and partner Kate Wilson-Smith lost to Björn Siegemund and Nicol Pitro of Germany in the round of 32.

External links
 Official website of the Athens 2004 Olympic Games

Australian male badminton players
Olympic badminton players of Australia
Badminton players at the 2004 Summer Olympics
1976 births
Living people
Badminton players at the 2006 Commonwealth Games
Commonwealth Games competitors for Australia